The Office of Graduate Studies and Sponsored Research coordinates the university's instructional, research and service programs.

Accreditation
The Southern Association of Colleges and Schools (SACS) authorized Savannah State University to offer graduate degrees.  The Master of Social Work program has been granted accreditation by the Council on Social Work Education (CSWE).

Departments
The Office of Graduate Studies and Sponsored Research has three divisions:
Department of Graduate Studies
Department of Research Grants/Sponsored Programs
Department of Survey Research Center

Degrees

Graduate programs
Master of Business Administration
Master of Public Administration
Master of Science in Marine Sciences
Master of Science in Urban Studies
Master of Social Work

References

Savannah State University
Savannah, Georgia